Araripedactylus was a large genus of pterodactyloid pterosaur, known from a single wing bone found in the Early Cretaceous Santana Formation of Brazil.

The genus was in 1977 named by Peter Wellnhofer who, unaware that the name Araripesaurus had been published by Price in 1971, presumed he was naming the first pterosaur genus from Brazil. The genus name refers to the Araripe Plateau and combines this with daktylos, Greek for "finger", a common element in pterosaur names since Pterodactylus. The type species is Araripedactylus dehmi; the specific name honours the German paleontologist Richard Dehm, a professor at the Munich institute that acquired the only known specimen in 1975.

The holotype, BSP 1975 I 166, consists of a single phalanx, the first of the right wing finger, embedded in an elongated chalk nodule. When the nodule was split to reveal the fossil, its distal end was damaged. The exemplar is that of an adult individual. The phalanx has a length of 55 centimetres.

Wellnhofer, because of the lack of further information, placed Araripedactylus in a general Pterodactyloidea. Alexander Kellner in 2000 assumed that in view of its provenance the species likely belonged to Ornithocheiroidea (sensu Kellner) and concluded that the phalanx was hard to distinguish from that of other large pterosaurs from the formation, such as Anhanguera or Tropeognathus. He could not confirm the exceptional thickness of the bone walls, nor any other autapomorphy of the genus.

The wingspan of Araripedactylus was estimated by Wellnhofer as at least 4.8 meters (15.75 ft), and in another publication at 5 meters (16.5 ft).

References

Literature
Wellnhofer, P., 1991, "The Santana Formation Pterosaurs", In: J. G. Maisey (ed.), Santana fossils: An Illustrated Atlas, T.F.H. Publications, Neptune, New Jersey, pp. 351–370

See also
 Timeline of pterosaur research
 List of pterosaurs

Ornithocheiroids
Early Cretaceous pterosaurs of South America
Cretaceous Brazil
Fossils of Brazil
Romualdo Formation
Fossil taxa described in 1977
Taxa named by Peter Wellnhofer